During the 1923–24 Scottish football season, Celtic competed in the Scottish First Division.

Results

Scottish First Division

Scottish Cup

Friendly in Ireland

References

Celtic F.C. seasons
Celtic